The Hooker River is a river in the Southern Alps of New Zealand. It flows south from Hooker Lake, the glacier lake of Hooker Glacier, which lies on the southern slopes of Aoraki / Mount Cook. After 3 kilometers, it flows through Mueller Glacier Lake, gathering more glacial water, before joining the braided streams of the Tasman River, also an outflow of a glacier lake.

Etymology
The geographic Hooker items were named by the Canterbury provincial geologist, Julius von Haast, after the English botanist William Jackson Hooker.

Description

The Hooker River drains both the Hooker and Mueller Glaciers and is the principal ablation outlet for these ice masses.  Its water is a milky bluish light grey due to the suspended glacial rock flour in the water. Hooker River along transports  of sediment per year.

The entire run of Hooker River is within the Aoraki / Mount Cook National Park and easily accessible, as it flows through the flat Hooker Valley, the main tourism area of the park.  The river is bridged three times by the pedestrian suspension bridges along the Hooker Valley Track, the most popular walking track in the area.  A further track leads further downstream along the river to Tasman Valley Road, which crosses Hooker River on a small one lane road bridge just as the river enters the Tasman Valley.

See also
List of rivers of New Zealand

References

Rivers of Canterbury, New Zealand
Aoraki / Mount Cook National Park
Rivers of New Zealand